The 2012 Africa Cup of Nations was an international football tournament held in Equatorial Guinea and Gabon from 21 January until 12 February 2012. The 16 national teams involved in the tournament were required to register a squad of 23 players; only players in those squads were eligible to take part in the tournament.

The deadline for participating associations to submit their squad was 11 January 2012 (midnight CET). Replacement of seriously injured players was permitted until 24 hours before the team in question's first Africa Cup of Nations match.

Should an association miss the deadline, it will be fined US$10,000. Only 21 players were allowed to register for the competition if the registration was received after 14 January 2012.

Group A
Source:

Equatorial Guinea
Coach:  Gílson Paulo

Libya
Coach:  Marcos Paqueta

Senegal
Coach: Amara Traoré

Zambia
Coach:  Hervé Renard

Group B
Source:

Angola
Coach: Lito Vidigal

Burkina Faso
Coach:  Paulo Duarte

Ivory Coast 
Coach: François Zahoui

Sudan
Coach: Mohamed Abdalla

Group C
Source:

Gabon
Coach:  Gernot Rohr

Morocco
Coach:  Eric Gerets

Niger
Coach: Harouna Gadbe

Tunisia
Coach: Sami Trabelsi

Group D
Source:

Botswana
Coach: Stanley Tshosane

Ghana
Coach:  Goran Stevanović

Note: ''Caps and goals may be incomplete for certain players, therefore being inaccurate.

Guinea
Coach:  Michel Dussuyer

Mali
Coach:  Alain Giresse

References

Africa Cup of Nations squads
Squads